Dill House may refer to:

Dill House (Fort Gaines, Georgia), listed on the National Register of Historic Places (NRHP)
Charles W. Dill House, Shoshone, Idaho, NRHP-listed in Lincoln County
Richard E. Dill House, Alexandria, Nebraska, NRHP-listed

See also
Dill Building, Boston, Massachusetts, NRHP-listed
Dill Farm, Shawangunk, New York, NRHP-listed
Dill Farm Site, Sandtown, Delaware, NRHP-listed
Dill School, Ida, Arkansas, NRHP-listed
Dill's Tavern, Dillsburg, Pennsylvania, NRHP-listed
Dille-Probst House, South Bend, Indiana, NRHP-listed
Dills Site, Frankfort, Kentucky, NRHP-listed in Franklin County
Harrison Dills House, Yakima, Washington, NRHP-listed in Yakima County